D. spinosa may refer to:
 Dalea spinosa, a tree species
 Deinopis spinosa, a net-casting spider species in the genus Deinopis
 Dennstaedtia spinosa, a fern species in the genus Dennstaedtia
 Desfontainia spinosa, a medicinal plant species
 Diaea spinosa, a crab spider species in the genus Diaea
 Didelta spinosa, a flowering plant species in the genus Didelta
 Diplolepis spinosa, a plant species in the genus Diplolepis
 Drypis spinosa, a moth food plant species

See also
 Spinosa (disambiguation)